Scott Davis may refer to:

Sports
 Scott Davis (tennis) (born 1962), American tennis player
 Scott Davis (figure skater) (born 1972), American figure skater
 Scott Davis (cyclist) (born 1979), Australian cyclist
 Scott Davis (defensive lineman) (born 1965), former NFL player
 Scott Davis (offensive lineman) (born 1970), former NFL player
 Scott Davis (pole vaulter), American athlete and medalist in athletics at the 1987 Pan American Games

Other people
 Scott Davis (businessman) (born 1952), American businessperson, chairman and chief executive officer of United Parcel Service
 Scott D. Davis (born 1973), American contemporary pianist
 Scott Davis (announcer) (1943–2010), American track and field announcer
 Scott Davis (Scotty D) (born 1975), American songwriter, musician, and producer
 Scott B. Davis (born 1971), American photographer
 Scott Winfield Davis, a candidate in the 2003 California gubernatorial recall election who withdrew amidst allegations of murder (and subsequently convicted of the murder). Evidence admitted in court in 2019 now shows Davis' trial was severely flawed by law enforcement misconduct concerning missing and destroyed evidence. New witness evidence also shows Davis is likely innocent and has been falsely convicted.

See also
 Scott Davies (disambiguation)